Vriddachalam taluk is a taluk of Cuddalore district of the Indian state of Tamil Nadu. The headquarters of the taluk is the town of Virudhachalam.

Demographics
According to the 2011 census, the taluk of Vriddachalam had a population of 423,035 with 215,798 males and 207,237 females. There were 960 women for every 1,000 men. The taluk had a literacy rate of 68.89%. Child population in the age group below 6 was 25,082 Males and 21,572 Females.

References 

Taluks of Cuddalore district